Arklow Rock Parnells GAA is a Gaelic Athletic Association club located in Arklow, County Wicklow, Ireland. The club is solely concerned with the game of hurling.

Honours

 Wicklow Senior Hurling Championship (6): 1970, 1971, 1972, 1977, 1982, 1985

External links
Arklow Rock Parnells GAA site

Gaelic games clubs in County Wicklow
Hurling clubs in County Wicklow